The Chambersburg, Greencastle & Waynesboro Street Railway, now defunct, was an American railroad of south central Pennsylvania built in the 19th and 20th centuries.

Origins

Tracks were first laid in Greencastle in 1903, with operations beginning in December along Baltimore Street and Carlisle Street.  The line was extended to Shady Grove by 1906 and Chambersburg in 1908. A line from Waynesboro met the Greencastle line at Shady Grove.  The Waynesboro line was extended to Pen Mar and Blue Ridge Summit.  The Pen Mar line was noted for its steep grades and sharp curves.

The CG&W met the Hagerstown Railway, later the Hagerstown & Frederick Railway (H&F) at Shady Grove next to the current post office.

"Union Station" was the junction of the Greencastle and Waynesboro trolley lines and the Hagerstown line in Shady Grove.  The Hagerstown line approached Shady Grove from the south and ended along the east side of the building which is now the Shady Grove post office where it met the Greencastle and Waynesboro lines.  The "Union Station" ticket office and building was a small white building right beside and on the east side of the Hagerstown tracks.

Because of the broad gauge, it could not carry rail freight, so it was denied a revenue source available to standard gauge systems. Service on most of the system ended on July 31, 1928. The Rouzerville-Chambersburg section finally ended service on January 13, 1932, a victim of the Depression and the automobile.

Gauge
The CG&W used a  broad gauge, similar to other Pennsylvania interurban lines.

See also
 Chambersburg and Gettysburg Electric Railway
 Chambersburg and Shippensburg Railway
 Cumberland Railway (Pennsylvania)

References 

Defunct Pennsylvania railroads
Interurban railways in Pennsylvania
Transportation in Franklin County, Pennsylvania
Railway companies established in 1903
Railway companies disestablished in 1932
5 ft 2½ in gauge railways in the United States
1903 establishments in Pennsylvania
1932 disestablishments in Pennsylvania